Justin Howes (1963–2005) was a British historian of printing and lettering.

Howes was a curator of the Type Museum of London and wrote on the work of Edward Johnston and William Caslon; his book Johnston's Underground Type on the Johnston lettering commissioned and used by London Underground and its predecessors remains the standard work on the topic. He also worked as a book and font designer and was working on a PhD at the time of his death.

The St Bride Foundation holds the annual Justin Howes Memorial Lecture at which scholars and practitioners of typography are invited to present a talk.

References

External links
 Tyndale Society obituary
 Microsoft Typography links on Howes' work

English historians
English art historians
1963 births
2005 deaths
Alumni of Christ Church, Oxford
People educated at Dulwich College
Historians of printing
People associated with the Oxford University Society of Bibliophiles